In Concert is the first live album by Sherbet, released in March 1975. It reached number 11 on the Kent Music Report in Australia.

Track listing

Charts

Personnel 
 Bass guitar, harmony vocals – Tony Mitchell 
 Drums, percussion – Alan Sandow 
 Lead guitar, slide guitar, harmony vocals – Clive Shakespeare 
 Lead vocals, tambourine – Daryl Braithwaite 
 Organ [Hammond], grand piano [Steinway Concert], mellotron, electric piano [Wurlitzer], harmony vocals – Garth Porter
Production 
 Producer – Roger Davies, Sherbet 
 Produced, engineered, mixed and edited by Richard Batchens

Notes 
 Recorded live on Sherbet's National '74 Spring Tour at the Sydney Opera House and Melbourne Festival Hall.
 Engineered, mixed and edited at Festival's 'Studio 24', December 1974.
 "Wishing Well" is a cover from Free's 1973 Heartbreaker album and was released as the B-side of the "Freedom" single.

Release history

References

Sherbet (band) albums
1975 live albums
Infinity Records albums
Festival Records live albums
Live albums by Australian artists
Albums produced by Richard Batchens